Cumbum may refer to:

Andhra Pradesh, India 

 Cumbum, Andhra Pradesh, a town
 Cumbum mandal, an administrative division
 Cumbum railway station, Praksam district

Tamil Nadu, India 

 Cumbum, Tamil Nadu, a town
 Cumbum Valley
 Cumbum (state assembly constituency), Theni district